Alan Frederick Weeks (8 September 1923, in Bristol – 11 June 1996, in Hove, East Sussex) was a British television sports reporter and commentator.

Personal life
His family moved to Brighton when he was five when his father, Captain F. C. Weeks, became piermaster. He attended Brighton Hove and Sussex Grammar School.

He married Barbara Jane Huckle, a figure skater, in 1947. They had two sons and one daughter. His daughter Beverley died at the age of 43 in 1992, following serious health problems. Nine years earlier, his son Nigel was found hanged at the age of 28.

War service
Weeks served his country through the Second World War in the British Merchant Navy, eventually being demobilised in 1946 as a lieutenant in the Royal Naval Reserve.

Career
Weeks worked all his broadcasting life with the BBC. Principally remembered for his commentary on winter sports such as ice skating and ice hockey, Weeks also presented swimming, snooker,  gymnastics and basketball. Weeks was also a big speedway fan, and broadcast from Wembley Stadium on the World Speedway finals from 1955 to 1969 and 1983 for the BBC. He reported for the BBC on every Winter Olympics from 1964 and most Summer Olympics until his retirement. As such he was on hand to describe the memorable gold medal wins of sports stars such as Olga Korbut, Mark Spitz, John Curry, Torvill and Dean and David Wilkie. For all this, he was affectionately nicknamed 'The Gold Medal Commentator' by his peers. Barry Davies took over his gymnastics duties in the Olympics, and Hamilton Bland in swimming. Davies and Weeks continued to commentate in ice-skating together, including the Torvill and Dean comeback at the 1994 Winter Olympics in Lillehammer, before a record audience of 23.9 million viewers in the UK on the BBC - a record audience for a non-football broadcast.

He was also an occasional presenter of Match of the Day and commentated on football on the BBC for 20 years, including five World Cup final tournaments and Newcastle United's last trophy win, the second leg of the 1969 Fairs Cup Final against Ujpest Dozja. He occasionally presented Grandstand, and for many years presented the snooker series Pot Black.

In 1989, British Ice Hockey honoured him by naming the award for Best British Defenceman after him, the Alan Weeks Trophy.

He made his last broadcast in early 1996, commentating at the World Figure Skating Championship, after which he announced his retirement. He died of cancer at his home on 11 June 1996 at the age of 72.

References

1923 births
1996 deaths
British Ice Hockey Hall of Fame inductees
British sports broadcasters
People educated at Brighton, Hove and Sussex Grammar School
Snooker writers and broadcasters
Royal Naval Reserve personnel
English association football commentators